La Paz is a  department located in the south of Catamarca Province in Argentina.

External links
La Paz Webpage (Spanish)

Departments of Catamarca Province